Kalgah may refer to various places in Iran:
 Kalgah, Fars, Fars Province
 Kalgah-e Gorosneh, Fars Province
 Kalgah-e Olya, Fars Province
 Kalgah-e Sofla, Fars Province
 Kalgah Shiraz, Fars Province
 Kalgah, Kermanshah
 Kalgah, Khuzestan
 Kalgah, Kohgiluyeh and Boyer-Ahmad
 Kalgah-e Pahn, Kohgiluyeh and Boyer-Ahmad Province

See also
 Kalegah (disambiguation)
 Kalgeh, a village in Rud Zard Rural District, in the Central District of Bagh-e Malek County, Khuzestan Province, Iran